Bayır (literally "hill") is a Turkish place name and may refer to the following places in Turkey:

Bayır, Alanya, a village in Alanya district, Antalya Province
Bayır, Muğla, a town in Muğla Province
Bayır Dam, a dam near the town

See also 
 Bayırköy (disambiguation), literally "hill village"
 Bayırlı (disambiguation), literally "place with hill(s)"